The Pentax K-5 is a 16.3-megapixel digital single-lens reflex camera, announced on September 20, 2010. It began shipping in mid-October 2010 and it was replaced by the Pentax K-5 II in the third quarter of 2012.

Externally, the camera body is almost unchanged from the Pentax K-7 (the mode dial on the left side is slightly higher). The main improvements compared to the previous model are higher light sensitivity (ISO range between 80 and 51,200, high ISO performance with improved noise control); an increase in sensor resolution by nearly two megapixels; and an all-new autofocus subsystem, SAFOX IX+.

The use of a Sony sensor in the K-5 signalled a major departure from the Samsung sensor partnership.

The latest firmware release is 1.16.

Feature improvements
Consistent with previous Pentax models, there are many small improvements as well:
 Multiple customizable "USER" modes
 Customizable raw/Fx button replaces previous single-purpose raw button
 Selectable noise reduction levels for each ISO value
 More auto-bracketing options
 1080p video (25 fps)
 7 fps continuous shooting at full resolution
 Bleach Bypass and Film Reversal image tone settings
 Electronic level now shows pitch and roll
 More grid overlays in live view mode

Notable features
 Rechargeable Li-Ion battery D-LI90 or 6 × AA (R6) batteries in battery grip D-BG4
 Magnesium alloy shell over stainless steel chassis, weather resistant with 77 weather protection seals.
 Two-axis (roll and pitch) level meter
 Automatic horizon correction up to 1° with SR on or 2° with SR off.
 HDR (high dynamic range) function with auto-align now usable in hand-held shooting
 SAFOX (Sensor Ability Fortifying Optical Compensation System-CS shortened to X) IX+ autofocus system that offers a choice of shutter-release options—between focus priority and release priority in the AF.S (single) advance mode, or between focus priority and speed priority in the AF.C (continuous) advance mode
 Lens correction for lens distortion and lateral chromatic aberration in Pentax FA, DA and DFA lenses
 The KAF2 mount is compatible with all Pentax K-mount lenses made since 1975.

More information is available at Pentax K-5 Camera Reviews and Specifications—PentaxForums

Video mode
The K-5 can record video at 1080p full HD as well as at lower resolutions using the motion JPEG codec. Videos can be recorded at the following resolutions and frame rates:
 1920×1080 (25 fps)
 1280×720 (25/30 fps)
 640×424 (25/30 fps)

DxOMark sensor tests
DxO Labs gave the 16.3 MP Sony-built sensor a score of 82. This ranked at the time of testing, the highest ever for an APS-C sensor and ahead of several full-frame sensors such as the one used in the Nikon D3. One of the major factors was shadow noise and dynamic range (in raw mode, to bypass in-camera processing). However, the closely related sensor in the Nikon D7000 scored 80.

Accessories
 The weather-sealed D-BG4 battery grip that fit the Pentax K-7 can also be used on the Pentax K-5.
 Pentax InfraRed Remote Control F or Wired Remote
 Pentax AF-360FGZ and AF-540FGZ External Flash units
 Pentax AF-160FC Flash Ring
 Pentax GPS Module O-GPS1

References

External links

 Pentax K-5 official product page

Notable reviews:
 Pentax K-5 Review - PentaxForums
 Pentax K-5 Hands-on Preview - Falk Lumo
 Pentax K-5: Features worth noting I - PentaxForums
 Pentax K-5 In-Depth Review - dpreview
 Pentax K-5 Review - Imaging Resource
 Pentax K-5 Review with gallery and sharpness comparison - Neocamera
 Pentax K-5 Review - ZTech

K-5
Live-preview digital cameras
Cameras introduced in 2010
Pentax K-mount cameras